Shuroobod is a village and a jamoat in Khatlon Region, located in southern Tajikistan. It is the seat of Shamsiddin Shohin District. The jamoat has a total population of 10,700 (2015).

References

Populated places in Khatlon Region